The Putative 3 TMS Holin (3-Hol) Family (TC# 1.E.56) is large, consisting of many members derived from Pseudomonadota and their phage, all of small size (85-105 amino acyl residues in length) and usually with 3 transmembrane segments (TMSs). A representative list of the proteins belonging to this family can be found in the Transporter Classification Database. While many of the proteins belonging to this family are annotated in holins, they remain functionally uncharacterized.

See also 
 Holin
 Lysin
 Transporter Classification Database

Further reading 
 Reddy, Bhaskara L.; Saier Jr., Milton H. (2013-11-01). "Topological and phylogenetic analyses of bacterial holin families and superfamilies". Biochimica et Biophysica Acta (BBA) - Biomembranes 1828 (11): 2654–2671. . . .
 Saier, Milton H.; Reddy, Bhaskara L. (2015-01-01). "Holins in Bacteria, Eukaryotes, and Archaea: Multifunctional Xenologues with Potential Biotechnological and Biomedical Applications". Journal of Bacteriology 197(1): 7–17. . . . .
 Wang, I. N.; Smith, D. L.; Young, R. (2000-01-01). "Holins: the protein clocks of bacteriophage infections". Annual Review of Microbiology 54: 799–825. . . .

References 

Holins